Microlenecamptus nakabayashii is a species of beetle in the family Cerambycidae. It was described by Takakuwa in 1992.

References

Dorcaschematini
Beetles described in 1992